The Air Creation Fun is a series of French single-surface ultralight trike wings, designed and produced by Air Création of Aubenas. The wing is widely used on Air Creation trikes as well as by other ultralight aircraft manufacturers.

Design and development
The series are cable-braced, king post-equipped hang glider-style wings designed as docile beginner and flight training wings for single and two-place trikes. They come in two sizes, the Fun 450, named for its gross weight in kilograms and the Fun 14, named for its metric wing area.

The wings are made from bolted-together aluminum tubing, with its single surface wing covered in Trilam Dacron sailcloth, with a Mylar leading edge. The wing's crosstube is exposed and is of a floating design. The Fun 14 has a  span, an aspect ratio of 7.4:1 and uses an "A" frame weight-shift control bar. The double surface portion is 40% and the wing folds using an "umbrella" system.

Variants
Fun 14
Fun 450
iFun 13
Second generation trike wing, designed for the Air Creation Pixel trike.
iFun 16
Second generation trike wing, designed for the Air Creation Skypper trike. Replaces the Fun 450 in the line.

Applications
Air Creation Racer, single-place
Air Creation Pixel
Air Creation Skypper
Air Creation Trek, two-place
Air Creation Twin

Specifications (Fun 14)

References

External links
Official website for the Fun 14
Official website for the Fun 450

Ultralight trike wings